Jennifer Kimball is a singer and songwriter who formed the folk duo The Story with Jonatha Brooke.

Career
Jennifer Kimball and Amherst College friend Jonatha Brooke began playing music together in the 1980s. They performed regularly during their college years. Their folk songs were marked by "witty wordplay and sumptuous pop harmonies," according to one music critic. Critics noted a resemblance between their music and earlier artists such as Joni Mitchell and Paul Simon in terms of excellent musicianship, singing, and writing. Kimball graduated from Amherst in 1986.

They called themselves The Story. One critic wrote "Jennifer Kimball played the Art Garfunkel role in The Story" who contributed "high ethereal harmonies." In 1989, the duo played the coffeehouse folk circuit and radio which exemplified the "folk-rock singer-songwriter aesthetic," according to one account. Kimball and Brooke "burst to fame" with this combination. They created a demo called Over Oceans and were promptly signed to the independent label Green Linnet which, in 1991, issued the duo's debut full-length album Grace in Gravity. Later Elektra Records signed The Story and re-issued their debut.

Their second album, The Angel in the House, was released in 1993. One critic raved about the "exquisite arrangements and tricky, pitch-perfect harmonies by Ms. Brooke and her vocal partner, Jennifer Kimball," and added they "are the last word in elegant folk-pop refinement." The album featured "moody jazz and Brazilian-flavored arrangements" and "the duo's harmonies, which usually begin in a comfortably folkish vein, frequently stray into precise chromatic dissonance" and had a "sophisticated international flavor." Their song Over Oceans was used as background for dance choreographer Kristen Caputo. The songs contemplate a woman's conflicting desires for love and achievement and the need to shake off the romantic myth of a male rescuer.

Another music critic noticed the contrast between the lighter patter between songs and the heavier songs themselves: there was "levity" between heavy songs about "God, church, death, female oppression, self-suppression, mothers and daughters." Their songs adroitly avoided "heavy-handedness" with a certain "winning buoyancy of tune and/or spirit" with "sophisticated harmonic changes whose intriguing hooks come at you cockeyed and sideways more often than they swoop down from the heavens." The duo were compared with artists such as Suzanne Vega and Indigo Girls. Another reviewer gave the duo mixed reviews: "intriguingly distorted harmonies and interesting turns of phrase" but some "attempts at cleverness overreached" and there was "a painfully obvious unrecorded song about dieting and a silly, albeit self-consciously so, stab at voguing a la Madonna." Another wrote their "music can alternate between heart-rending poetry and infectious flights of fancy."

Solo albums
In 1994, Kimball and Brooke dissolved their musical partnership, while Kimball performed as a singer-songwriter in various venues and continued to write music.

In 1998, Kimball released the album Veering from the Wave. A Washington Post critic applauded the singing as "handsome" and the songwriting as excellent. In 1999, Kimball opened for folk artists such as Tom Rush. In 2000, she was a featured performer at New Haven's Eli Whitney Folk Festival. Her tune Meet Me in the Twilight has been played on the radio, including San Francisco station KPFA. She's recorded with such artists as Wayfaring Strangers, Session Americana, and Tony Trischka. Her music has been described by a critic as "quirky and oh-so-urban suburban" and a "sultry roots singer" with the "aching breath of a mezzo."

Kimball released her CD Oh Hear Us in 2006. One critic wrote "her songs still ripple with eccentric surprise, sudden twists, and "A-ha!" moments."

In 2007 she was a part-time horticulturalist and studied landscape design at Harvard. She commented about her hobby: "It's a lovely way to keep the head 'free' while working outside and dreaming up songs, designs, novels." She sang and played at Boston's Lizard Lounge with musicians including guitarist Duke Levine, lap steel player Kevin Barry, drummer Bill Beard, bassist Richard Gates, and guest artists including Dennis Brennan, Kris Delmhorst, Rose Polenzani, Anne Heaton, and Rose Cousins.

Since 2008, Kimball performed with Boston artists such as Rose Polenzani and Rose Cousins, occasionally as the Wintery Songs in Eleventy Part Harmony. A critic described them as "a veritable supergroup of some of the finest local singer-songwriters."

Personal 
At the beginning of her career, Kimball also worked as a children's book designer for Little and Brown. Kimball has performed to raise money for charitable organizations such as Massachusetts Families in Need. She also supports the cause of helping women's shelters. She is a mother of one son and lives in the Boston, Massachusetts area, while she has also studied landscape design and ecology at the BAC.

Discography

References

External links
Bio at her website
Jennifer Kimball at Discogs

Feminist musicians
Amherst College alumni
Living people
American women singer-songwriters
American folk musicians
Musicians from Boston
American folk singers
1960s births
21st-century American women
Singer-songwriters from Massachusetts